Decontamination (sometimes abbreviated as decon, dcon, or decontam) is the process of removing contaminants on an object or area, including chemicals, micro-organisms or radioactive substances. This may be achieved by chemical reaction, disinfection or physical removal. It refers to specific action taken to reduce the hazard posed by such contaminants, as opposed to general cleaning.

Decontamination is most commonly used in medical environments, including dentistry, surgery and veterinary science, in the process of food preparation, in environmental science, and in forensic science.

Methods
Methods of decontamination include:
Physical cleaning
Water purification
Ultrasonic cleaning
Disinfection
Antisepsis
Sterilization

A variety of decontaminant methods may be used, including physical processes such as distillation, and chemical washes such as alcohols and detergents.

See also 
Human decontamination
Soil decontamination
Groundwater decontamination
Environmental remediation
Dry decontamination
Decontamination foam

References

Hygiene